Sascha Wolfert (born February 26, 1990) is a German footballer who plays as a forward. He is currently playing for Viktoria Aschaffenburg.

Career

Early in his career, Wolfert played reserve football for Kickers Offenbach, Eintracht Frankfurt and 1. FC Kaiserslautern, and made two first-team appearances for the latter, his debut coming in October 2012, as a substitute for Konstantinos Fortounis in a 2. Bundesliga match against 1. FC Köln. He signed for SV Wehen Wiesbaden in July 2013, and spent half a season with the club before moving to SV Elversberg. He left Elversberg six months later after the club were relegated from the 3. Liga.

External links

1990 births
Living people
German footballers
Kickers Offenbach players
Eintracht Frankfurt II players
1. FC Kaiserslautern II players
1. FC Kaiserslautern players
SV Wehen Wiesbaden players
SV Elversberg players
2. Bundesliga players
3. Liga players
Association football forwards
People from Aschaffenburg
Sportspeople from Lower Franconia
Footballers from Bavaria